The 2017 ITTF Men's World Cup was a table tennis competition held in Liège, Belgium, from 20 to 22 October 2017. It was the 38th edition of the ITTF-sanctioned event, and the fourth time that it had been staged in Belgium.

In the final, Germany's Dimitrij Ovtcharov defeated fellow German Timo Boll, 4–2, to win his first World Cup title.

Qualification

The following list of players was confirmed on 25 September 2017, based on the qualification system set by the ITTF.

Competition format

The tournament consisted of two stages: a preliminary group stage and a knockout stage. The players seeded 9 to 20 were drawn into four groups, with three players in each group. The top two players from each group then joined the top eight seeded players in the second stage of the competition, which consisted of a knockout draw.

Seeding

The seeding list was based on the official ITTF world ranking for October 2017.

Preliminary stage

The preliminary group stage took place on 20 October, with the top two players in each group progressing to the main draw.

Chen Chien-an withdrew from the competition on the opening day due to illness.

Main draw

The knockout stage took place from 21–22 October.

See also
2017 World Table Tennis Championships
2017 ITTF Women's World Cup
2017 ITTF World Tour
2017 ITTF World Tour Grand Finals

References

External links
ITTF website

Men
Table tennis competitions in Belgium
International sports competitions hosted by Belgium
ITTF
ITTF
Sport in Liège
ITTF